Veera Kesari is a 1963 Indian Kannada-language swashbuckler film  directed by B. Vittalacharya and produced by Sundarlal Nahatha and Doondi. The film stars Rajkumar, T. N. Balakrishna, Udaykumar and R. Nagendra Rao. The film has musical score by Ghantasala. S. Siddalingaiah was the assistant director of this movie. B. Vittalacharya shot the movie simultaneously in Telugu as Bandipotu, with N. T. Rama Rao.

Critics have called it  a "clever adaptation of the adventures of Robin Hood"  with the core theme of the romantic portion inspired by William Shakespeares  The Taming of the Shrew. The film had its climax scene in Eastmancolor. The film was a major box office success. Midway through the movie, Vittalacharya, who suffered from typhoid, asked his friend, M. R. Vittal to complete the shoot. Vittal completed a major portion of the shoot including the song Mellusire Savigaana, but refused to be credited as the director.

Story
SaptaSena Maharaja R. Nagendra Rao has lost his legs and administration is taken over by ShooraSimha (Udaykumar). ShooraSimha rules with an iron hand, torturing the masses and quelling rebellions. He has an affair with the palace-courtesan, but aims to marry the princess MandaaraMaala (Leelavathi). Narasimha (Rajkumar), whose uncle (K. S. Ashwath) has gone into hiding, is waging a rebellion against ShooraSimha. K. S. Ashwath, popularly known as Musuku-veera is the hero with a face mask.

K. S. Ashwath's elder brother, H. Ramachandra Shastry though, doesn't agree to the armed fight. things come to a pass, when Narasimha wards off K. S. Ashwath's attempt to kidnap Mandaaramaale.

Giving into his brother's wish, K. S. Ashwath agrees to formally complain to SaptaSena Maharaja. However, ShooraSimha kills both the brothers before they get a hearing in front of SaptaSena Maharaja. Before dying, H. Ramachandra Shastry asks Narasimha to give up the ahimsa-way he had followed all his life and take up cudgels against ShooraSimha's misdeeds.

Narasimha takes over the role of his Uncle's Musuku-veera role, kidnaps MandaaraMaale, makes her aware of the harsh conditions masses brace through.
He releases her, once she appreciates the common man's trouble. Romance blooms between MandaaraMaale and Narasimha, much to the chagrin of ShooraSimha.

SaptaSena Maharaja gets wind of ShooraSimha's misdeeds and confronts him. ShooraSimha loses his mind and imprisons SaptaSena Maharaja. The Palace-courtesan makes up a plot of Damsel in Distress, finds the hide-away of Musuku-veera, thus getting ShooraSimha to nab him by sleight. Condemned to prison, Narasimha is to be executed at the same moment as ShooraSimha's ascension to the throne.

In a final showdown, Narasimha escapes from prison, beats ShooraSimha at his own game, bringing peace to the kingdom. SaptaSena Maharaja offers the kingdom and his daughter's hand to NaraSimha. NaraSimha vows to rule the kingdom, purely to offer succour to the masses.

Cast

Soundtrack
The music was composed by Ghantasala.

References

External links
 

1963 films
1960s Kannada-language films
Films scored by Ghantasala (musician)
1960s multilingual films
Indian multilingual films
Indian historical fantasy films
Indian films based on plays
Indian swashbuckler films
Films directed by B. Vittalacharya
Films partially in color